Towler may refer to:

Bernard Towler (1912–1992), English footballer
Candice Towler-Green, English ice dancer
Dan Towler, American NFL player
Diane Towler, English ice dancer
Edwin Towler, English footballer
Harley Towler, English badminton player
John C. Towler (1939-2015), American lawyer and politician
Keith Towler, British social worker
Michael D. Towler, British physicist
Phillipa Towler-Green, English ice dancer
Raymond Towler, American musician